Anolis baleatus, the Dominican giant anole  or Puerto Plata anole, is a species of lizard in the family Dactyloidae. The species is found in Dominican Republic.

References

Anoles
Reptiles of the Dominican Republic
Endemic fauna of the Dominican Republic
Reptiles described in 1864
Taxa named by Edward Drinker Cope